Immaculate Conception Cemetery is a Roman Catholic cemetery in the Upper Montclair neighborhood of Montclair in New Jersey, United States.

Notable burials
 Angelo Bertelli (1921–1999), 1943 Heisman Trophy winner.
 Mule Haas (1903–1974), MLB center fielder.
 Lou Monte (1917–1989), singer of funny Italian songs, like "Pepino, the Italian Mouse" (1962).
 Bob Hooper (1922–1980), MLB pitcher 
 Ed Reulbach (1882–1961), MLB pitcher.
 Grif Teller (1899–1993), artist famous for his paintings for the Pennsylvania Railroad.

References

Cemeteries in Essex County, New Jersey
Roman Catholic cemeteries in New Jersey
Montclair, New Jersey
Upper Montclair, New Jersey